The Isfahan National Holy Association (1906 - 1908) was the main political and decision-making bureau of Isfahan, Iran during the first Persian Constitutional Revolution period. The members of the council were elected by the people of Isfahan and Nurollah Najafi Isfahani chaired the council. The association was formed between years 1906 and 1908, namely from the migration of Qom to the 1908 bombardment of the Majlis at the Fort of Chehel Sotoun in Isfahan.

History
Following the Persian Constitutional Revolution, the people of Isfahan were able to expel Mass'oud Mirza Zell-e Soltan from Isfahan by pursuing their protests and rallies led by Aqa Najafi Isfahani. After that, the Isfahan National Holy Association was responsible of Isfahan city administration, whose members were elected by the people through free elections.

Members

Members of the Isfahan National Holy Association were:
 Haj Agha Nourollah Najafi Isfahani, Seyed Abolghasem Zanjani and Sheikh Morteza Rizi from the Ulama guild election
 Mohammad Ibrahim Malek al-Tojjar and Mohammad Hussein Kazerouni from the trade union election
 Hassan Bonakdar and Mahmoud Bonakdar from guild class election
 Mirza Mohammad Ali Kalbasi and Hassan Modarres from the mullahs guild election
 Mirza Ali Akbar Sheikh al-Islam

Actions
Among the features of the Isfahan National Holy Association and the important actions of its founding clerics are the following:
 Extensive and unparalleled mobilization of the people to support the goals of the Persian Constitutional Revolution
 The establishment of dozens of political and provincial associations
 Efforts to be accountable public officials and spreading the spirit of rational inquiry
 Effective measures to reform military, financial, commercial, regional welfare and economic services
 Efforts to establish new social institutions such as new banks and schools

The Isfahan National Holy Association in comparison with to the other contemporary communities, has been one of the most prolific and endorsing examples in the country.

Factor that caused tension in the relationship between the National Consultative Assembly and the Isfahan National Holy Association was the issue of the entry of the former ruler into the Isfahan and the serious opposition of the people and the Isfahan National Holy Association. This was despite the National Consultative Assembly strong request.

Isfahan National Holy Association Newspaper
The newspaper of the Isfahan National Holy Association was published 15 days after the formation of the Association on 5 January 1907, reflecting the summary of the negotiations of the members of the Association. Expressing the principles of constitutionality and citing urban events was the focus of this newspaper's articles. Serajuddin Jebel Ameli Mousavi was the editor of this newspaper. The first 78 volume of this newspaper was published in the Isfahan by Mohammad Ali Chelunger efforts, sponsored by Isfahan Recreational Cultural Organization.

The subtle point in the headline of this newspaper is the conversion of Gregorian calendar to Solar Hijri calendar without mentioning the Iranian months. This change may be seen as a reaction to the foreigners and honoring the National Iranian calendar, which was undoubtedly due to the growing nationalism among Iranian people. The same attitude prompted the British Embassy's secretary to report to his country about two Isfahan newspapers (the Isfahan National Holy Association newspaper and the Jahade Akbar newspaper), especially those who spoke out against foreigners.

See also
 Anjoman-e Safakhaneh
 Tarikhe Dokhanieh
 Constitutional Revolution's Associations
 Persian Constitutional Revolution
 Women's Freedom Association
 Jam'iyat-e Nesvan-e Vatankhah
 Women in Constitutional Revolution
 Mokhadarat Vatan Association
 Central Society
 Moqim va Mosafer
 Revolutionary Committee (Persia)
 Recapture of Isfahan
 Secret Center
 Secret Society (Persia)
 Shabnameh
 Society of Humanity
 National Consultative Assembly

References

External links 
 Picture of Isfahan National Holy Association Newspaper

Iranian culture
Culture in Isfahan
Persian Constitutional Revolution
Iranian democracy movements
Organizations established in 1906
1906 establishments in Iran